Wistin Abela (19 October 1933 – 20 January 2014) was a Maltese politician. He was the Finance Minister from 1983 to 1987, and the Deputy Prime Minister of Malta from 1981 to 1983.

Biography
Wistin Abela was involved in the Labour party since 1959, and became the president of a district's committee in 1961. He was also a mathematics teacher.

Wistin Abela served in the Parliament of Malta from 1966 to 1996, representing Zejtun. During his tenure, he worked on the creation of Air Malta, the transition to color of TV station Xandir Malta, the Malta Shipbuilding. He was part of the delegation representing Malta on the country's first participation to the conference of the Non-Aligned Movement in 1973.

Wistin Abela served as Parliamentary secretary for finance under Prime Minister Dom Mintoff from 1971 to 1974, Minister for development from 1974 to 1976, Minister of energy, ports, and telecommunications starting in 1976, and as deputy leader of the Labour Party and deputy prime minister between 1981 and 1982. He had initially ran for deputy leader in 1976 but had lost against Joseph Cassar.

Other tenures
Since 1983: Governor of the International Bank for Reconstruction and Development in Malta

Prizes
1997: Companion of the National Order of Merit of Malta

Personal life
Wistin Abela was married to Catherine Abela. They had 3 children.

References

External links
 Official biography 

1933 births
2014 deaths
Deputy Prime Ministers of Malta
Finance Ministers of Malta
Labour Party (Malta) politicians
Government ministers of Malta
20th-century Maltese politicians